David Burt (born 28 November 1901, date of death unknown) was a New Zealand cricketer. He played in one first-class match for Wellington in 1924/25.

See also
 List of Wellington representative cricketers

References

External links
 

1901 births
Year of death missing
New Zealand cricketers
Wellington cricketers
Cricketers from Auckland